Cabildo abierto del 22 de mayo de 1810 ("Open Cabildo of May 22, 1810") is a portrait made by the Chilean artist Pedro Subercaseaux. It shows the artist's interpretation of the Open Cabildo that took place in Buenos Aires on May 22, 1810, in the Buenos Aires Cabildo, and which was a turning point of the May Revolution.

Creation
The portrait was painted in Chile in 1908, as requested by Ángel Justiniano Carranza, for the centennial of the May Revolution that would take place in 1810. Subercaseaux mailed the following terms:

According to current European historicist, Subercaseaux tried to choose a defining moment, recreate the atmosphere and give the magnificence required. To make lighting and perspective studies he was based on contemporary photos inside the Buenos Aires Cabildo, although it had been remodeled and was no longer similar to the colonial period. The moment depicted is the one when Juan José Paso, who is the one that stands out from the crowd on the left, takes his turn to talk. In the crowd right in front, Mariano Moreno is represented with a grave and worried face.

Currently, the portrait is kept at the National Historical Museum.

References

Argentine paintings
Works about the Argentine War of Independence
1908 paintings
National Historical Museum (Argentina)
Paintings in Argentina